Life Goes On is the sixth studio album by Canadian country music singer Terri Clark. It was released in 2005 as her final album for Mercury Nashville and produced three singles in "She Didn't Have Time", "Damn Right" and "Slow News Day". After this album's release, Clark left Mercury Records.

The album was originally to be called Honky Tonk Songs, with the first single being "The World Needs a Drink".

Track listing

Personnel

 Mike Brignardello – bass guitar
 Tom Bukovac – electric guitar
 Terri Clark – lead vocals, background vocals
 Lisa Cochran – background vocals
 Dan Dugmore – steel guitar
 Stuart Duncan – fiddle, mandolin
 Paul Franklin – dobro, steel guitar, lap steel guitar
 Byron Gallimore – electric guitar, organ
 Sonny Garrish – steel guitar
 Aubrey Haynie – fiddle
 Wes Hightower – background vocals

 B. James Lowry – acoustic guitar
 Liana Manis – background vocals
 Brent Mason – electric guitar
 Steve Nathan – keyboards, organ, piano
 Leslie Satcher – background vocals
 Russell Terrell – background vocals
 Cindy Richardson-Walker – background vocals
 John Willis – acoustic guitar
 Lonnie Wilson – drums, percussion
 Glenn Worf – bass guitar

Chart performance

References

2005 albums
Mercury Nashville albums
Terri Clark albums
Albums produced by Byron Gallimore
Albums produced by James Stroud